The CESC Tunnel is situated under the Hooghly River in Kolkata, West Bengal, India. This is the first underwater tunnel in Asia, completed in 1931. It is using for electric power transmission from Kolkata to Howrah.

History 
This tunnel was not made by modern tunnel boring machine. It was made by simple tools like spade, shovel etc. Indian Punjabi labours were digging this tunnel and attached the cast iron rings with the tunnel wall.

Sir Harley Hugh Dalrymple was the project head of this construction. He and the boiler specialist John Lochrance was designed Asia's first underwater tunnel in 1928.

The construction was began in March 1930. At first labours digging a well on the Hooghly River side at Indian Botanic Garden in Howrah. After one month, another similar well began digging on the opposite side of Hooghly River at Metiabruz in Kolkata. The wells digging process were taken to complete first four months. Then the main  tunnel digging process was began from Metiabruz side, under  from the river bottom.

The Asia's first underwater tunnel was finally completed in July 1931. The total construction of this tunnel took 17 months to complete. Two Indian labours and Normal Smith a British worker died during the construction.

Importance 
The CESC tunnel was specially studied by the engineers of Kolkata Metro, for the construction of East West Metro Tunnel. This tunnel is an important part of the electric supply system of the CESC Limited company.

References 

Tunnels
Tunnels completed in 1931
Hydroelectricity in Asia